Leptenicodes quadrilineatus is a species of beetle in the family Cerambycidae. It was described by Austrian entomologist, Stephan von Breuning in 1953. It is known from New Caledonia.

References

Enicodini
Beetles described in 1953